Mercado de São José (in English Saint Joseph's Market) is a public market in Recife, Pernambuco. Founded in 1871, it is the oldest Brazilian building constructed of pre-manufactured iron.

The market is made up of  545 shops which sell a variety of fish, spices, herbs, crafts and cordel literature.

The market is a Brazilian historic heritage site.

References

Buildings and structures in Recife
Sao Jose
National heritage sites of Pernambuco